Gotytom Gebreslase (born 15 January 1995) is an Ethiopian long-distance runner. She won the gold medal in the marathon at the 2022 World Athletics Championships. In 2021, in her marathon debut, Gebreslase took victory in the women's race at the Berlin Marathon in Germany.

She ran in the delayed 2021 Tokyo Marathon and finished third in a time of 2:18:18. She also placed third at the 2022 New York City Marathon.

Career
A 16-year-old Gotytom Gebreslase won the gold medal in the girls' 3000 metres at the 2011 World Youth Championships in Athletics held in Lille Métropole, France.

The next year, she earned the bronze medal in the women's 5000 meters event at the 2012 African Championships in Athletics in Porto-Novo, Benin.

In 2013, Gebreslase competed in the junior women's race at the World Cross Country Championships held in Bydgoszcz, Poland.

In 2015, she finished in fourth place in the women's 5000 metres at the African Games in Brazzaville, Congo.

Achievements

International competitions

Personal bests
 5000 metres – 14:57.33 (Heusden-Zolder 2015)
 10,000 metres – 31:14.52 (Hengelo 2016)
Road
 10 kilometres – 32:07 (Shelter Island, NY 2017)
 Half marathon – 1:05:36 (Manama 2021)
 Marathon – 2:18:11 (Eugene, OR 2022)

References

External links
 

Living people
1995 births
Place of birth missing (living people)
Ethiopian female long-distance runners
Ethiopian female marathon runners
Ethiopian female cross country runners
African Games competitors for Ethiopia
Athletes (track and field) at the 2015 African Games
Berlin Marathon female winners
20th-century Ethiopian women
21st-century Ethiopian women